Damián Leandro Casalinuovo (born 6 June 1987) is a retired Argentine professional footballer who played as a striker. Casalinuovo also has an Italian passport, due to descent.

Career 
Casalinuovo began his career with Velez Sarsfield, graduating through the youth ranks and featuring twice for the first team. After a year with Platense, Casalinuovo joined Scottish Premier League side Dundee United in 2009. United believed that there would be no transfer fee to pay, but a FIFA tribunal later ordered them to pay €400,000 (reduced to €230,000 on appeal). Casalinuovo moved on loan to Raith Rovers in the First Division, scoring on his début, in a 2-0 Fife derby win against Dunfermline Athletic. He also scored on his second appearance for the Rovers against Partick Thistle at Stark's Park before being recalled in mid-September. In his next game for United, Casalinuovo started his first match and also scored his first goal, netting the winner in the 3–2 victory against St Johnstone.

Damian signed for Hamilton Academical on 31 August 2010 for an undisclosed fee, on a two-year deal. On 11 April 2011, Casalinuovo was released by Hamilton, having made 19 appearances for them in the Scottish Premier League. On 6 January 2012 Damian rejoined Raith Rovers until the end of the season. After making eleven appearances and scoring three times he left the club.

After leaving Rovers, Casalinuovo announced his retirement after a back problem forced him to retire and has since moved back to his native Argentina to become an accountant.

References

1987 births
Living people
Association football forwards
Argentine footballers
Argentine expatriate footballers
Argentine people of Italian descent
Expatriate footballers in Scotland
Club Atlético Vélez Sarsfield footballers
Club Atlético Platense footballers
Dundee United F.C. players
Raith Rovers F.C. players
Hamilton Academical F.C. players
Argentine Primera División players
Scottish Premier League players
Scottish Football League players
Argentine expatriate sportspeople in Scotland
Citizens of Italy through descent
Italian sportspeople of Argentine descent
Footballers from Buenos Aires